Velveeswarar Temple, also known as Agasteeswarar Temple, is a Hindu temple in Chennai, India. Situated adjoining the Arcot Road in the neighbourhood of Valasaravakkam, the temple encloses a large pond and is dedicated to Shiva. The temple is of considerable antiquity and is believed to have been constructed by Kulothunga Chola I.

See also
 Heritage structures in Chennai
 Religion in Chennai

References 

 
 

Hindu temples in Chennai